Nationality words link to articles with information on the nation's poetry or literature (for instance, Irish or France).

Events

Works published
 Samuel Boyse, Deity
 Moses Browne, Poems on Various Subjects
 Mary Collier, The Woman's Labour: An epistle to Mr. Stephen Duck
 Robert Nugent, 1st Earl Nugent, Irish poet, published in the United Kingdom:
 An Epistle to the Right Honourable, Sir Robert Walpole, attributed to Nugent
 An Ode on Mr. Pulteney, published anonymously
 An Ode to His Royal Highness on His Birthday, published anonymously
 Odes and Epistles, published anonymously
 Laetitia Pilkington, The Statues; or, The Trial of Constancy, published anonymously
 Elizabeth Rowe, Miscellaneous Works in Prose and Verse, including "The History of Joseph", English, Colonial America, posthumously published
 Jonathan Swift, Verses on the Death of Dr. Swift, Written by Himself, revised and expanded version of The Life and Genuine Character of Doctor Swift 1731
 John Wesley and Charles Wesley, Hymns and Sacred Poems (see also A Collection of Psalms and Hymns 1741)
 Paul Whitehead, Manners: A Satire

Births
Death years link to the corresponding "[year] in poetry" article:
 March 24 – Christian Friedrich Daniel Schubart (died 1791), German  poet, organist, composer and journalist
 Joseph Friedrich Engelschall (died 1797), German
 Twm o'r Nant, also known as Thomas Edwards, (died 1810), Welsh language dramatist and poet
 Edward Thompson

Deaths
Birth years link to the corresponding "[year] in poetry" article:
 Hildebrand Jacob

See also

 Poetry
 List of years in poetry
 List of years in literature
 18th century in poetry
 18th century in literature
 Augustan poetry
 Scriblerus Club

Notes

 "A Timeline of English Poetry" Web page of the Representative Poetry Online Web site, University of Toronto

18th-century poetry
Poetry